Manfred Joller (born 10 April 1968) is a retired Swiss football defender.

References

1968 births
Living people
Swiss men's footballers
FC Luzern players
SC Kriens players
Association football defenders